The year 2022 will be the 7th year in the history of the Brave Combat Federation, a mixed martial arts promotion based in Bahrain.

List of events

BRAVE CF Flyweight Tournament

Background 
BRAVE Combat Federation will look to crown its first Flyweight world champion with a 8-man tournament.

The eight participants of the tournament were revealed. They included the former Bantamweight World Champion Zach Makovsky, the formers UFC fighter Dustin Ortiz, Ali Bagautinov, Jose Torres as well as Abdul Hussein, Flavio de Queiroz, Velimurad Alkhasov and the former Cage Fury Flyweight Champion Sean Santella.

BRAVE CF Flyweight Tournament bracket 

1Zach Makovsky got a Quarterfinal bye as Abdul Hussein pulled out due to illness during the weightcut. 

2First bout between Torres and Sean Santella ended in a draw at Brave CF 42; Santella was replaced for the rematch by Blaine O’Driscoll due to injury and the bout was held at the Catchweight of 61 kgs 

3Torres pulled out due to weight cut difficulties and was replaced by Sean Santella

Road to BRAVE CF: Korea

Road to BRAVE CF: Korea will be a mixed martial arts event held by Brave Combat Federation in partnership with Beast Championship Federation on January 7, 2022 in Daegu, South Korea.

Background

Results

BRAVE CF 57 

BRAVE CF 57 was a mixed martial arts event held by Brave Combat Federation on March 11, 2022 at the Khalifa Sports City Stadium in Isa Town, Bahrain.

Background 
A BRAVE CF Bantamweight Championship bout for the vacant title between Hamza Kooheji and Brad Katona was scheduled as the event headliner.

Two additional title fights were scheduled for the event: a BRAVE CF Light Heavyweight Championship bout for the vacant title between Mohamed Said Maalem and Mohammad Fakhreddine, as well as an interim BRAVE CF Lightweight Championship bout between Abdisalam Kubanychbek and Amin Ayoub.

A flyweight bout between Rizvan Abuev and Asu Almabayev was planned for the event. However, Abuev was forced to pull out due to broken ankle. Almabayev takes on Imram Magaramov who step in on 2 weeks notice for the fight.

Results

BRAVE CF 58 

BRAVE CF 58 was a mixed martial arts event held by Brave Combat Federation in partnership with Beast Championship Federation on April 30, 2022 at the Samsan World Gymnasium in Incheon, South Korea. South Korea will become the 26th country to host a BRAVE CF show.

Background 
The main event was set to feature a featherweight bout between Tae Kyun Kim and Roman Bogatov, but Kim has been forced to pull out due to a hand injury and the bout with Bogatov has been scratched. A Middleweight bout between Mzwandile Hlongwa and In Jae La, which has been previously announced for the card, will now serve as the main event.

A super lightweight bout between Maciej Gierszewski and Mihail Kotruţă was planned for the event. However, Kotruţă was out due to injury and Issa Isakov was in against Gierszewski.

Results

BRAVE CF 59 

BRAVE CF 59 was a mixed martial arts event held by Brave Combat Federation in partnership with  Amir Temur Fighting Championship on June 18, 2022  in Bukhara, Uzbekistan. Uzbekistan will become the 27th country to host a BRAVE CF show.

Background 
Asuper lightweight bout between Baz Mohammad and Ayub Gazievwas planned for the event. However, Mohammad pulled out in early June due to undisclosed reasons and he was replaced by Sanjarbek Erkinov.

Results

BRAVE CF 60 

BRAVE CF 60 was a mixed martial arts event held by Brave Combat Federation on July 30, 2022 at the National Stadium, in Isa Town, Bahrain.

Background 
The event was originally expected to take place at the Goiânia Arena in Goiania, Brazil on July 30. However, on July 24, due to unforeseen circumstances the event was moved from Brazil to the Kingdom of Bahrain.

Results

BRAVE CF 61 

BRAVE CF 61 was a mixed martial arts event held by Brave Combat Federation in partnership with National Fighting Championship on August 6, 2022 at the Maritim Hotel in Bonn, Germany. Germany will become the 28th country to host a BRAVE CF show.

Background

Results

BRAVE CF 62 

BRAVE CF 62 will be a mixed martial arts event held by Brave Combat Federation in partnership with Octagon League on September 30, 2022 at the Baluan Sholak Sports Palace in Almaty, Kazakhstan.

Background 
The event will feature a lightweight bout between former UFC fighter Rolando Dy and the Kazakhstan National Champion in Combat Sambo Olzhas Eskaraev.

Results

BRAVE CF 63: Two Title Fights 

BRAVE CF 63: Two Title Fights was a mixed martial arts event held by Brave Combat Federation on October 19, 2022 at the Khalifa Sports City Stadium in Isa Town, Bahrain.

Background 
This event featured two title fights, first a super welterweight bout between Marcin Bandel and Ismail Naurdiev for the vacant BRAVE Combat Federation Super Welterweight Championship as event headliner and in the co-main event a bantamweight bout the champion Brad Katona and Gamzat Magomedov for the BRAVE Combat Federation Bantamweight Championship.

Results

BRAVE CF 64: African All Star 

BRAVE CF 64: African All Star was a mixed martial arts event held by Brave Combat Federation on October 22, 2022 at the Khalifa Sports City Stadium in Isa Town, Bahrain.

Background 
This main event featured a title fight for the vacant BRAVE Combat Federation Super Welterweight Championship between Tae Kyun Kim and Roman Bogatov as event headliner.

Results

BRAVE CF 65: Rumble in the Kingdom 

BRAVE CF 65: Rumble in the Kingdom was a mixed martial arts event held by Brave Combat Federation on October 28, 2022 at the Khalifa Sports City Stadium in Isa Town, Bahrain.

Background

Results

BRAVE CF 66 

BRAVE CF 66 was a mixed martial arts event held by Brave Combat Federation on November 26, 2022 at the Politeknik Pariwisata in Bali, Indonesia.

Background

Results

BRAVE CF 67 

BRAVE CF 67 was a mixed martial arts event held by Brave Combat Federation on December 12, 2022 at the Hall B in Manama, Bahrain.

Background

Results

BRAVE CF 68 

BRAVE CF 68 will be a mixed martial arts event held by Brave Combat Federation in partnership with National Fighting Championship on December 17, 2022 at the Maritim Hotel in Düsseldorf, Germany.

Background

Fight Card

See also 

 List of current Brave CF fighters
 List of current mixed martial arts champions
 2022 in UFC
 2022 in Bellator MMA
 2022 in ONE Championship
 2022 in Absolute Championship Akhmat
 2022 in Konfrontacja Sztuk Walki
 2022 in Rizin Fighting Federation
 2022 in AMC Fight Nights 
 2022 in Road FC
 2022 Professional Fighters League season
 2022 in Eagle Fighting Championship
 2022 in Legacy Fighting Alliance

References 

Brave Combat Federation
Brave Combat Federation
Brave Combat Federation